The Adventuress sailing dinghy class was designed by Ian Proctor and built by Anglo Marine of Essex. It is no longer in production. 

The Adventuress is classed as a family dinghy due to its spacious design and stable hull made so by the unique bilge keels. It is ideally suited for families, or less experienced sailors, or those who want a solid, easily handled, undemanding dinghy for cruising. Although larger than both, being 12.5 foot in length, the Adventuress could be compared to a Heron or Gull (which is also built by Anglo Marine).

The dinghy is 12 feet 6 inches long with a mast just over 18 feet.

It is sailed with a Mainsail and Jib and performs very well, remaining balanced in all conditions.

Construction
The Adventuress is constructed of GRP. The bilge keels are formed as an integral part of the hull, and create dynamic and directional stability - they do not contain ballast. The hull and deck mouldings have inner mouldings that create built-in buoyancy tanks at bow and stern and along each side.

The configuration of the bow buoyancy tank creates a area for stowage space under the foredeck.

The deck and inner mouldings have a moulded-in non-slip pattern on the decks and side benches. The inner edge of the side deck is contoured, making the boat comfortable to sit inside, and also comfortable to the backs of the legs when sitting on or hiking out over the side decks.

A marine plywood case houses the centreboard, and it also supports the cross-thwart - which is made from solid mahogany.

Moulded into the back is a useful locker with a marine ply hatch though not watertight.

Rig
The boat is equipped with an aluminium mast and boom are used to set a bermuda rig of mainsail and jib, the mainsail is also loose-footed.

Sailing
For its size the Adventuress is ideal for learning or relaxed family cruising, although, given enough wind, the boat will plane off the wind.

Despite its size, because of its uncluttered cockpit and simple controls, the boat can accommodate up to four people while sailing.

Dinghies
Boats designed by Ian Proctor